Edin Rustemović (born 6 January 1993) is a Bosnian professional footballer who plays as a midfielder in Kazakhstan for Shakhter Karagandy.

Club career
Rustemović started his career at FK Drina Zvornik where in January 2012 he got awarded among the 10 best sports people from the town of Zvornik for the year 2011. He made his debut in the 2010–11 Premier League of Bosnia and Herzegovina with Drina.

In summer 2012, he came on trials at FK Vojvodina, but in a friendly match against FC Copenhagen he broke his leg in a horrific injury. The injury changed his career path and after several months of rehabilitation. He subsequently joined OFK Beograd in the winter 2012-13 transfer window.

OFK Beograd
After almost a year without playing professional football from his injury with FK Vojvodina, Rustemović made his debut for OFK Beograd in a 1-3 loss against FK Jagodina. In summer 2013 he was loaned to Serbian First League promoted side FK Sinđelić Beograd.

Career statistics

Honours
Sarajevo
Bosnian Premier League: 2014–15

Note
Some generalistic football websites confuse him with another player, Edi Rustemović, who is Montenegrin and born in 1988.

References

External links
Edin Rustemović at Sofascore

1993 births
Living people
Sportspeople from Wiesbaden
Footballers from Hesse
Association football midfielders
Bosnia and Herzegovina footballers
FK Drina Zvornik players
OFK Beograd players
FK Sinđelić Beograd players
FK Sarajevo players
Adana Demirspor footballers
FK Sloboda Tuzla players
HŠK Zrinjski Mostar players
FK Tuzla City players
FC Shakhter Karagandy players
Serbian SuperLiga players
Serbian First League players
Premier League of Bosnia and Herzegovina players
TFF First League players
Bosnia and Herzegovina expatriate footballers
Expatriate footballers in Serbia
Bosnia and Herzegovina expatriate sportspeople in Serbia
Expatriate footballers in Turkey
Bosnia and Herzegovina expatriate sportspeople in Turkey
Expatriate footballers in Kazakhstan
Bosnia and Herzegovina expatriate sportspeople in Kazakhstan